Judy Troy (born 1951) is a professor emerita at Auburn University, as well as a short story writer and novelist. Before becoming writer-in-residence at Auburn, she taught at Indiana University and the University of Missouri. She received a 1996 Whiting Award.

Her work includes "Ramone" appearing in The Habit of Art : Best Stories from the Indiana University Fiction Workshop published 1996 and Ten Miles West of Venus published 1997.  She also has a story in Sudden Fiction (Continued) (60 New Short-Short Stories). Other published works include West of Venus, From the Black Hills and Mourning Doves: Stories. Mourning Doves was nominated for a Los Angeles Times Book Award.

Troy has a B.A. from the University of Illinois and an M.A. from Indiana University.

External links
Bio at Auburn Univ.
PrenHall bio
Profile at The Whiting Foundation

1951 births
Living people
20th-century American novelists
American women short story writers
American women novelists
Auburn University faculty
University of Illinois alumni
Indiana University alumni
University of Missouri faculty
Jewish American novelists
20th-century American women writers
20th-century American short story writers
Novelists from Missouri
Novelists from Alabama
American women academics
21st-century American Jews
21st-century American women